The National Premier League, also known for sponsorship purposes as the Red Stripe Premier League, is sanctioned by the Jamaican Football Federation as the top division for men's association football in Jamaica. Contested between 12 clubs, it operates on a system of promotion and relegation with Jamaica's regional Super Leagues where the two lowest placed teams are relegated to their corresponding local second division league.

History
The National Premier League was formed in 1973 to serve as the top tier of Jamaican professional club football. The league's inaugural season kicked off on September 22, 1973 as the Kingston Major League, and finished with Santos F.C. as the first title winners. 13 different clubs have been crowned champions of Jamaica. With Portmore United being the most successful team with 7 national titles.     

To date, the league has produced four Caribbean champions: Portmore United (2005, 2019) and Harbour View (2004, 2007).    

As of the 2020 season, no team from the league has made it past the first round of the CONCACAF Champions League. The league has been more successful in the new CONCACAF League competition with both Portmore United (2018) and Waterhouse (2019) making it to the quarterfinals. The 2019-2020 season was ruled null and void due to COVID-19 pandemic on March 12, 2020.

In May 2021, the Jamaican Football Federation announced that the National Premier League would resume, playing a shortened season between June and September, competed by the 12 teams from the previous season In June 2021, UWI F.C. announced it would withdraw ahead of the 2021 season due to the modified schedule conflicting with other player commitments; leaving 11 teams in the competition.

Competition format
The Premier League's regular season typically runs from late August to May the following year. Teams are organized into a single-table format and the competition is divided into three stages, with clubs playing each other once during each stage. Following the third stage (33 matches), the teams are divided into two groups based on point totals and enter the fourth round of league play. The top six clubs contend for the championship, with the bottom six teams fighting to avoid relegation. The bottom two finishers are replaced the next season by the top two finishers of the second division regional playoffs.

The top two finishers in a given season qualify for the CFU Club Championship, a regional club tournament held each spring. A top-four finish in the CFU Club Championship is the only route for Jamaican teams to enter the CONCACAF Champions League and the CONCACAF League.

2022 Clubs
A total of 12 teams contest the league in the current season.

Champions

Champions
Since the inaugural 1973-74 season, 13 teams have claimed the National Premier League title. As of 2022, Cavalier are the reigning title holders, making this their first league title in 40 years along with winning their second title in history.

Note: No championship was awarded for the 1978–79, 1981–82, and 2019-2020 seasons.

Source: RSSSF

Top scorers

Source: JPL Statistics

Premier League Awards
At the conclusion of each season, the league presents several awards for outstanding achievements, mostly to players, but also coaches, referees, and commissioners.

Fair Play
Junior Player of the Year
NPL Season MVP
Coach of the Year
Tony Burrowes Player Personality of the Year
Top Goal Scorer or the Year
Goalkeeper of the Year
Referees for the Season
Match Commissioner of the Year

References

External links
Official Website
Jamaica – List of Champions, RSSSF.com
Premier League summary(SOCCERWAY)

 
1
Jamaica
1973 establishments in Jamaica
Sports leagues established in 1973